Meharban Singh Rawat is an Indian politician and member of the Bharatiya Janata Party. Rawat was a member of the Madhya Pradesh Legislative Assembly from the Sabalgarh constituency in Morena district from 2013 to 2018.

References 

People from Morena district
Bharatiya Janata Party politicians from Madhya Pradesh
Madhya Pradesh MLAs 2013–2018
Living people
Year of birth missing (living people)